Curtin is an unincorporated community in Douglas County, Oregon, United States. It stands at an elevation of 404 feet.

The community was named for Daniel Curtin, who was a local sawmill owner in the 1890s. Curtin post office was established in May 1908. Its ZIP Code was 97428, but as of 2008, Curtin post office had closed out to Cottage Grove.

Climate
This region experiences warm (but not hot) and dry summers, with no average monthly temperatures above .  According to the Köppen Climate Classification system, Curtin has a warm-summer Mediterranean climate, abbreviated "Csb" on climate maps.

References

External links

Unincorporated communities in Douglas County, Oregon
1908 establishments in Oregon
Populated places established in 1908
Unincorporated communities in Oregon